Shorts (also known as Shorts: The Adventures of the Wishing Rock and released internationally as The Wishing Rock) is a 2009 fantasy comedy film written and directed by Robert Rodriguez. The film stars Jon Cryer, William H. Macy, Leslie Mann, James Spader, Jimmy Bennett and Kat Dennings.

Shorts: The Adventures of the Wishing Rock made its world premiere screening on August 15, 2009, at the Grauman's Chinese Theatre in Hollywood, California. Shortly after that, the movie was theatrically released in the United States on August 21, 2009, by Warner Bros. Pictures. The film grossed $29 million on a $20 million budget. It received mixed reviews from critics. It received a Young Artist Award nomination for Best Performance in a Feature Film. Shorts: The Adventures of the Wishing Rock was released on DVD and Blu-ray on November 24, 2009, by Warner Home Video. A Wii and Nintendo DS video game of the same name was announced on June 23, 2009, with a prospective July release date in advance of the film's release, but was canceled.

Plot

The film is set in a very busy suburban company town in Austin, Texas called Black Falls Community, where every adult always works, and citizens and children use the company's famous product "The Black Box", a technological device that can turn into almost any gadget imaginable. (Some of the events will be considered as "episodes" and will be randomized due to the narrator being unable to correctly remember the order of events).

Episode One
A rainbow-colored Wishing Rock appears at the end of a rainbow where it is found by Loogie, Laser, and Lug Short. They use it to wish for various things like a fortress, crocodiles that can stand on two legs and climb walls, snakes, and a pterodactyl before wishing themselves back home. They eventually wish that one of them was very smart; however, the power is given to their infant sister in the form of psychic abilities. Now having telekinesis and is able to speak telepathically, she convinces the boys to dispose of the rock, which they do using a catapult. Cole finds the rock the next day to throw at Toby.

Episode Two
Toby Thompson is bullied by Helvetica Black and her brother Cole on the way to school. Toby speculates that Helvetica has feelings for him, infuriating Helvetica, and Toby is dumped in a trash can. Later that day after school, Cole and his gang to start throwing rocks at Toby. One of the rocks they throw is the wishing rock, which Toby uses to wish for friends, which come in the form of small aliens. Toby takes the aliens to school, but their presence causes Toby and Helvetica to fall from the school's roof. This results in both Toby and Helvetica having casts put on both arms. The aliens leave, but Toby keeps the rock.

Episode Three
Toby’s parents, Bill and Jane Thompson, like all adults in the town, work for Black Box Unlimited Worldwide Industries Incorporated, which manufactures the "Black Box" universal gadget. They are assigned by Mr. Carbon Black, owner of Black Box, to compete to create a new marketing strategy. Jane finds the rock in Toby’s room and takes it. She and Mr. Thompson go to a Black Box costume party. Since they were having trouble with their relationship, she wishes that she and her husband were closer. They become merged into a two-headed person, but Carbon thinks that they're wearing a costume.

Meanwhile, Toby realizes that his mother took the rock and rushes to the costume party, but runs into Helvetica and Cole, who take the rock and dump him in the garbage. An infuriated Hel wishes that Cole would turn into a dung beetle and then loses the rock. The rock is found by Carbon who, unaware of its power, accidentally wishes for all of the employees to go for each other's throats. Helvetica takes the rock, wishes off her casts, and attempts to escape on a rocket-powered bike that she wished for, but hits a curb and loses the rock again before Toby retrieves it and wishes everyone back to normal. Helvetica attempts to get the rock back, but Toby throws it as far away as he can, where it lands at the Noseworthy's house.

Episode Four
Toby’s older sister Stacey arrives to tutor "Nose" Noseworthy, Toby’s old, germaphobic friend. Nose picks his nose against his father's wishes and accidentally flicks the booger into his father's radioactive work study. Toby and Loogie, now friends, arrive at Nose's house in time to see Nose's booger mutate into a giant monster who eats the rock. Toby eventually retrieves the rock with Nose's help. After helping Nose's father capture the monster outside, Toby and Loogie take the rock and leave.

Episode Five
As Toby and Loogie contemplate what to do with the rock, Toby wishes his casts on his arm are off. They are confronted by Helvetica and Cole, who want the rock back. They are suddenly chased and stampeded by the rest of the kids and fight until the rock winds up in the hands of Carbon. Carbon wishes that he was the most powerful thing in the world and turns into a giant Black Box robot. Hel uses the rock to turn into a giant wasp and Cole uses it to turn into a giant dung beetle in an attempt to stop their father, aided by Toby's aliens and Loogie's humanoid crocodiles. The infant appears, uses her powers to stop a crocodile from eating her, and tells them that the rock is starting to feel misused, as shown by the fact that the rock is starting to undo all of their wishes. She also tells them the rock could destroy the Earth because of all of the petty wishes they make. Together they get rid of the rock and all of its effects are undone. Toby’s parents decide to work on the marketing plan together and Carbon agrees. Carbon changes the Black Box into the more environmentally friendly Green Box. The Noseworthys lose their germaphobia, Toby’s parents become closer, and it is suggested that Helvetica and Toby will marry in the future. All the children become friends and wished that their story would become a Hollywood movie, breaking the 4th wall.

Cast

Kids

 Jimmy Bennett as Toby Thompson, an 11-year-old boy who was the second to find the wishing rock.
 Jolie Vanier as Helvetica Black, Mr. Black's daughter and a classmate of Toby's. She bullies Toby, though it is shown she secretly has a crush on him. 
 Trevor Gagnon as Loogie Short, a boy who found the wishing rock. When he had the wishing rock he wished for unreasonable stuff. He flirted with Toby's older sister throughout the movie.
 Jake Short as "Nose" Noseworthy, a germophobe scientist like his father and Toby's old friend.
 Rebel Rodriguez as Lug Short, Loogie's second half brother. He is the most video game obsessed and easily angered of the three Short brothers.
 Leo Howard as Laser Short, Loogie's 12-year-old older brother. He seems to be the smartest of the three Short brothers.
 Bianca Rodriguez as the Short brothers' infant sister, simply referred to as "(the) Baby". She is voiced by Elizabeth Avellan.
 Devon Gearhart as Colbert "Cole" Black, Carbon's 13-year-old son and captain of the football team. He's Hel's older brother who cares deeply for her and is the leader of his own gang which Hel sometimes leads.
 Racer Rodriguez as Bully #1, a football player who is a member of Cole's gang.
 Rocket Rodriguez as Bully #2, also a football player who is a member of Cole's gang.
 Cambell Westmoreland as Blinker #1
 Zoe Webb as Blinker #2

Adults

 Jon Cryer as Mr. Bill Thompson, Toby's father and Jane's husband who works at Black Box, Inc.
 Leslie Mann as Mrs. Jane Thompson, Toby's mother and Bill's wife who also works at Black Box, Inc.
 James Spader as Mr. Carbon Black, Hel and Cole's father and the founder of the Black Box Community.
 William H. Macy as Dr. Noseworthy, A germophobe scientist who does not like Contamination.
 Kat Dennings as Stacey Thompson, Toby's 23-year-old older sister.
 Alejandro Rose-Garcia as John, Stacey's boyfriend.
 Nick Cassavetes as Cole (deleted scenes)
 Heather Wahlquist as Therese (deleted scenes)

Production

On January 11, 2008, it was announced that Robert Rodriguez would direct, produce and write a 2009 American and Emirati live action and animated family science fiction fantasy adventure comedy movie which features live action and CGI animation titled Shorts also known as Shorts: The Adventures of the Wishing Rock.

On July 16, 2008, it was announced that Jimmy Bennett would play the lead role in the film, while Jon Cryer, Leslie Mann and Kat Dennings were in early talks to join the cast. On July 17, 2008, William H. Macy, Jolie Vanier, Devon Gearhart, James Spader and Trevor Gagnon were also in final talks to join the film, Rebel Rodriguez, Leo Howard, Bianca Rodriguez, Elizabeth Avellan, Jake Short, Racer Rodriguez, Rocket Rodriguez, Alejandro Rose-Garcia, Cambell Westmoreland and Zoe Webb were added to the cast.

Shorts: The Adventures of the Wishing Rock was filmed in Austin, Texas. The special effects were done by KNB EFX Group, Troublemaker Digital Studios and Hybride Technologies for the animation.

George Oldziey, Robert Rodriguez and Carl Thiel scored the music for the film on its soundtrack and the film's soundtrack contains "Spy Ballet" performed by Robert Rodriguez and "Summer Never Ends" performed by Jimmy Bennett. Warner Bros. Pictures distributed the film.

Release
Shorts: The Adventures of the Wishing Rock was released in cinemas on August 21, 2009, in the US by Warner Bros. Pictures, and on DVD and Blu-ray on November 24, 2009, by Warner Home Video.

Reception

Critical response

The film holds a 47% approval rating on critical response aggregation website Rotten Tomatoes, based on 103 reviews. The site's critical consensus reads, "Shorts has imagination and energy, but most viewers beyond elementary school will likely tire of the kiddie humor and sensory overload." On Metacritic, the film holds a score of 53 out of 100, based on 22 critics, indicating "mixed or average reviews". Audiences polled by CinemaScore gave the film an average of "C+" on an A+ to F scale.

Box office
For its opening weekend, the film made $6.4 million, an average of $2,065 per each of 3,105 theaters. It opened at #6, being overshadowed by Inglourious Basterds, G.I. Joe: The Rise of Cobra, and Julie & Julia. Overall, the grossed about $20.9 million in the United States and Canada, and about $29 million worldwide.

Awards

Soundtrack

George Oldziey, Robert Rodriguez and Carl Thiel scored the music for the film on its soundtrack and the film's soundtrack contains "Spy Ballet" performed by Robert Rodriguez and "Summer Never Ends" performed by Jimmy Bennett. The soundtrack was released in 2009 by Warner Bros. Records.

Songs and music
 Spy Ballet – Robert Rodriguez
 Summer Never Ends – Jimmy Bennett
 It’s Not Just Make Believe - Kari Kimmel 
 I Predict a Riot - Kaiser Chiefs 
 Never Alone - Barlowgirl
 All Music – Composed by George Oldziey, Robert Rodriguez and Carl Thiel

References

External links
 Official Site
 Official Facebook
 
 
 

2009 films
2000s children's fantasy films
2000s fantasy comedy films
Films scored by Robert Rodriguez
Films about wish fulfillment
Films directed by Robert Rodriguez
Films produced by Elizabeth Avellán
Films produced by Robert Rodriguez
Media Rights Capital films
American nonlinear narrative films
Films with screenplays by Robert Rodriguez
Films about shapeshifting
Troublemaker Studios films
Warner Bros. films
2009 comedy films
2000s English-language films
2000s American films